Qapugtang (Tibetan: བྱ་ཕུག་ཐང།) is a town in Zadoi County, Qinghai, China. The county seat of Zadoi is located in the Town of Qapugtang. Qapugtang has an altitude of about 4068.5 m.

Formerly known as Jiezha Township, Qapugtang Town was renamed in 2001. Qapugtang has a population of about 7000. Qapugtang is accessible through the Provincial Highway 309 of Qinghai. Qapugtang was in the affected area of the 2010 Yushu earthquake, and the reconstruction of Qapugtang was supported by Xining.

References 

Populated places in Qinghai
Township-level divisions of Qinghai
Yushu Tibetan Autonomous Prefecture